The Cauchie House is a town house in Brussels, Belgium. It was built in 1905 by Art Nouveau architect, painter, and designer Paul Cauchie, in Etterbeek, next to the Parc du Cinquantenaire/Jubelpark. Its facade is remarkable for its allegorical sgraffiti.

Background
Paul Cauchie was sixteen when he began his architectural studies at the Royal Academy of Fine Arts in Antwerp (in the classes of Joseph Schadde and Léonard Blomme). Very soon afterwards, he enrolled at the Royal Academy of Fine Arts in Brussels (in the class of Constant Montald), where he studied painting (as a pupil of Jean Portaels) and the sgraffito technique, and followed courses in decorative painting (1893–1898). From 1895, whilst still pursuing his studies, Cauchie started to work for a living. Apart from his own house, only three houses built by Cauchie are known: two others in Brussels and one at Duinbergen, next to Knokke-Heist, in West Flanders, Belgium. As Cauchie was more of a decorator than an architect, he specialised in designing sgraffiti for architecture.

Cauchie met his future wife in the Royal Academy of Fine Arts. Carolina 'Lina' Voet achieved a very good level in painting, enabling her to teach drawing and painting privately. They married in 1905 and decided to build a house on the  plot of land Cauchie bought at 5, /, next to the Parc du Cinquantenaire/Jubelpark in Brussels. He designed the front of the house with the intention of advertising and selling their work: sgraffiti for him and art teaching for her. As the house was easily seen from the neighbouring roads, it drew the attention of passers-by and demonstrated their know-how.

Building
At the very centre of the facade, Cauchie drew the words "". The house was designed, from the very beginning, as a joint work intended for private use. Cauchie did the drawings for the house but worked together with his wife to design and decorate their home-workshop. Cauchie and his wife filled the house with their multiple works of art (paintings, wall coverings, furniture, etc.)

The Cauchie House is a good example of the application of the principle of a unified work of art or Gesamtkunstwerk ("total work of art") in architecture. Cauchie and his wife wanted that the distinction between the main art forms (architecture, painting, sculpture) and the minor art forms (decorative arts) disappeared to become part of the global œuvre.

Tintin Museum in the Cauchie House
In 1979, the Cauchie House's saving led to the idea of using it to house an Adventures of Tintin museum in cooperation with their creator, Hergé. Symbolically, on Christmas Day, 1980, Hergé gave Dessicy his official agreement to the project. Dessicy undertook an intensive study  with Bob De Moor, who laid the bases of the scenography. A scale model was made by the Studios Hergé. Dessicy started looking for sponsors and supports. In the meantime, he devoted himself to saving another building, the former Magasins Waucquez, work of the Belgian architect Victor Horta. Despite many steps taken to find sponsors, Dessicy did not succeed in creating sufficient interest to complete his project of a Tintin Museum at the Cauchie House. Eventually, Desiccy succeeded in turning the Magasins Waucquez into the Belgian Comic Strip Center.

The Cauchie House today
The basement, containing the cellars and Paul Cauchie's workshop, has been converted into a vast gallery, exhibiting photos, paintings, and archive documents, meticulously collected over the years by the Maison Cauchie ASBL. They illustrate the stages of the house's restoration and the artistic activities of Paul and Lina Cauchie. The ground floor freed of the unfortunate alteration carried out by the successive occupants after Paul's death has recovered its original appearance. The two upper floors of the house have been converted into apartments and renovated in accordance with contemporary needs.

See also
 Art Nouveau in Brussels
 History of Brussels
 Belgium in "the long nineteenth century"

References

Notes

Bibliography

External links

 Official website of Cauchie House
 Paul Cauchie's chronology (in French)

Houses in Belgium
Etterbeek
Art Nouveau architecture in Brussels
Art Nouveau houses
Houses completed in 1905
1905 establishments in Belgium